Languaculture is a term meaning that a language includes not only elements such as grammar and vocabulary, but also past knowledge, local and cultural information, habits and behaviours. The term was created by the American anthropologist Michael Agar.

Meaning
Agar used the term "languaculture" for the first time in his book Language Shock: Understanding the culture of conversation. Languaculture is a supposed improvement on the term "linguaculture" coined by the American linguistic anthropologist Paul Friedrich. Agar explains the change stating that "language" is a more commonly used word in English. It seems that "linguaculture" is getting more common again (cf. Risager 2012).

When Agar talks about languaculture, he defines it as the necessary tie between language and culture. He underlines that languages and cultures are always closely related and it is not possible to distinguish languages from cultures. Therefore, you cannot really know a language if you do not know also the culture expressed by that language.

The notion of culture and its understanding involve the link between two different languacultures that Agar define LC1 (source languaculture) and LC2 (target languaculture).

Rich points
The learning of target languaculture is driven by "rich points", which are when people realize that a culture is different from their own and when they face some behaviours which they do not understand. Rich points are those surprises, those departures from an outsider's expectations that signal a difference between source languaculture and target languaculture. They are the moments of incomprehension, when people suddenly do not know what is happening. In this situation different reactions are possible. People can ignore the rich point and hope that the next part makes sense. People can perceive it as evidence that the person who produced it lacks something. Or people can wonder why they do not understand and if maybe some other languaculture comes into play. Therefore, rich points belong to daily life and not only to language. Agar highlights that the term rich has the positive connotations of thickness, wealth and abundance. The largest rich point is the total incomprehension due to huge differences between source languaculture and target languaculture. In this case people are facing a "culture shock" that causes a deep bewilderment. The smallest rich point can occur among different groups of the same community.

The existence of rich points comes from the fact that every statement implicitly refers to various elements that are taken for granted in a certain culture and do not match the elements of another culture (cultural implicitness).

Culture in languaculture
According to Agar, culture is a construction, a translation between source languaculture and target languaculture. Like a translation, it makes no sense to talk about the culture of X without saying the culture of X for Y, taking into account the standpoint from which it is observed. For this reason culture is relational.
Moreover, culture is always plural. No person or group can be described, explained or generalized completely with a single cultural label.

Notes

References
 Agar, Michael, The professional stranger: An informal introduction to ethnography, New York, Academic Press, 1996.
 Byrnes, Heidi, Advanced Language Learning: The Contribution of Halliday and Vygotsky, London, Continuum, 2006.
 Friedrich, Paul, Language, Ideology, and Political Economy in American Anthropologist, 91, 2, 1989, pp. 295–312.
 Hansen, Hans Lauge, Disciplines and Interdisciplinarity in Foreign Language Studies, Copenhagen, Museum Tusculanum Press, 2004.
 Risager, Karen, Language and Culture: Global Flows and Local Complexity, Clevedon, Multilingual Matters, 2006.
 Risager, Karen, Linguaculture, in Carol A. Chapelle ed. Encyclopiedia of Applied Linguistics, Wiley 2012. https://doi.org/10.1002/9781405198431.wbeal0709 

Anthropological linguistics
Sociolinguistics
Language
Culture